Mabel Itohanosa Erioyunvwen Evwierhoma (born 7 May 1965) is a Nigerian academic. She is Professor of Theatre Arts at the University of Abuja. She specializes in dramatic theory, criticism, gender studies and cultural studies.

Life
Mabel Evwierhoma was born to Peter Omoviroro Tobrise and Theodora Tobrise, née Aiwerioghene. She attended Abadina Primary School from 1970 to 1975;, and the Federal Government Girls College, Bauchi from 1976 to 1981. She gained her Higher School Certificate in 1983 from Federal School of Arts and Science, Suleja. She proceeded to the University of Ibadan, gaining a BA in Theatre Arts in 1986 and an MA in 1988. From 1989 to 1990 she was a tutorial assistant at the University of Ibadan before joining the University of Abuja in 1990 as an assistant lecturer. She gained her PhD in 1996, and was promoted full Professor in 2005.

A festschrift for Evwierhoma was published in 2015. She delivered an inaugural professorial lecture at the University of Abuja, 'Mother is gold', on 21 January 2016. In 2019 she was one of three candidates shortlisted for the position of vice chancellor of the University of Abuja.

In June 2020 Evwierhoma delivered a lecture 'Rape as Anti-culture in Contemporary Nigeria', calling for cultural resistance and constitutional provisions against rape.

Works
 Out of hiding: poems. Ibadan: Sam Bookman Publishers, 2001.
 Female empowerment and dramatic creativity in Nigeria. Ibadan, Nigeria: Caltop Publications, 2002.
 (ed, with Gbemisola Adeoti) After the Nobel Prize : reflections on African literature, governance, and development. Lagos, Nigeria: Association of Nigerian Authors, 2006
 Nigerian feminist theatre : essays on female axes in contemporary Nigerian drama, 2014
 (ed. with Methuselah Jeremiah) Snapshots of the female ethos : essays on women in drama and culture of Africa. Lagos, Nigeria : Concept Publications Limited, 2015.

References

1965 births
Living people
Nigerian women academics
University of Ibadan alumni
Academic staff of the University of Abuja